Chiebuka Emmanuel Ihemeje (born 9 October 1998) is an Italian triple jumper. He competed at the 2020 Summer Olympics, in Triple jump.

Biography
Ihemeje was born in Carrara, Tuscany to Nigerian parents but lives in Verdellino near Bergamo. He jumped to the honors of the international sports news on 13 March 2021 when, winning the triple jump race at the NCCA Indoor Track and Field Championships in Fayetteville, Arkansas with the measure of 17.26 m, he established the fourth best Italian indoor all-time performance (fifth overall considering also the you turned out to be outdoor), the minimum for the Tokyo 2021 Olympics and the third best performance in the seasonal world lists.

He start the 2021 outdoor season winning the 2021 NCAA Division I Outdoor Track and Field Championships triple jump with his outdoor best of 17.14 m.

Personal bests
Triple jump outdoor: 17.14 m ( Eugene, 11 June 2021)
Triple jump indoor: 17.26 m ( Fayetteville, 13 March 2021)

Achievements
Youth level

See also
 Italian all-time lists - Triple jump
 Naturalized athletes of Italy

References

External links
 

1998 births
Italian male triple jumpers
Living people
Italian people of Nigerian descent
Italian sportspeople of African descent
People from Carrara
Sportspeople from the Province of Bergamo
Oregon Ducks men's track and field athletes
Athletes (track and field) at the 2020 Summer Olympics
Olympic athletes of Italy
Sportspeople from the Province of Massa-Carrara
20th-century Italian people
21st-century Italian people